Albert Myer may refer to:

 Albert J. Myer (1828–1880), surgeon and US Army officer
 Albert L. Myer (1846–1914), mayor of Ponce, Puerto Rico, 1899
 USNS Albert J. Myer, a U.S. Army cable ship named for Albert J. Myer, later long Navy service